Zhang Yu'an (born March 4, 1984) is a Chinese television personality and radio host, who is currently active in South Korea. He was a cast member in the talk show Non-Summit and its spin-off travel-reality show, Where Is My Friend's Home.

Personal

Born in Shenyang and grew up in Anshan, China, he graduated from Jilin University.

Career

He was an announcer for Beijing TV before moving to South Korea, and is currently a host in the radio show 首尔生活加油站. He is also a teacher at a Chinese language hagwon in Gangnam.

On July 7, 2014, he appeared as a cast member on Non-Summit, representing his home country of China. Popular with the South Korean visiting guests on the show,
 media wrote that he "captured the hearts of viewers with his endless charm and his innocence, as he strongly states his opinions".

In February, 2015, his home in China was the first one selected for a visit by the travel-reality show Where Is My Friend's Home where he played host to some of his fellow cast members from Non-Summit, for a six-day, five night visit to some popular tourist spots in China, and visits with his family in Anshan. He continued as cast on episodes for visits to the next countries, Belgium and Nepal.

After signing with entertainment agency SM C&C, he said  he would continue activities in the Korean and Chinese markets.

In April 2015, he was the special MC for the 2015 The 3rd YinYueTai V-Chart Awards held in Beijing, China.

In January 2016, he became Hwang Chi Yeul's Mango TV manager for I Am a Singer Season 4.

Filmography

Television series

Variety shows

References

External links

1984 births
Chinese expatriates in South Korea
Chinese television personalities
Jilin University alumni
Living people
People from Shenyang
Chinese radio presenters
Chinese sports announcers